Philip Robertson may refer to:

 Philip Robertson (British Army officer) (1866–1936), British Army general
 Philip Robertson (chemist) (1884–1969), New Zealand chemist, university professor, and writer
 G. Philip Robertson, American biologist
 Phil Robertson, American hunter, businessman and reality television star